The World Skate Roller Hockey World Cup is the international championship for roller hockey organized by World Skate. The first event was held in 1936, in the city of Stuttgart. Since 1989, the World Championship tournament is held every two years on the odd years. Until 2017, it was organized by the Fédération Internationale de Roller Sports. As of 2019, following the merge between the FIRS and the International Skateboarding Federation, the World Cup is now an event of the larger World Roller Games.

Through the 2019 World Cup, only five countries have taken the Roller Hockey World Cup: England winning two times, Portugal winning sixteen times, Spain winning seventeen times, Italy winning four times and Argentina winning five times.

Since the 2003 World Cup all events have been 16-team events, featuring a four group round-robin tournament with four teams in each group. The top two teams in each group advance to an eight team knockout final series.

Results

Summaries

Ranking

FIRS Roller Hockey "B" World Championship

The FIRS Roller Hockey "B" World Championship was the second-tier level international championship for roller hockey organized by FIRS. The event was a 7 to 9-team event, featuring a two group round-robin tournament. The top four teams in each group advanced to an eight team knockout final series. This model was discontinued in favour of a B group in the "A" World Championship, starting with the 2017 FIRS Roller Hockey World Cup.

The tournament was held every two years, on the even years. The first event was held in 1984, in the city of Paris.

The first three-placed nations were granted an entry to next year's "A" World Championship and the last three-placed nations on the "A" tournament were relegated to the next year's "B" World Championship.

Summaries

Ranking

See also 
Women's Roller Hockey World Cup
Roller Hockey World Cup U-20

References

External links
 CERH (Comité Européen de Rink Hockey) official website
 http://www.worldskate.org/ World Skate official website

 
World Cup
World Cup
Recurring sporting events established in 1936
Hockey
Roller